Central Atlas Tamazight or Atlasic (also known as Central Morocco Tamazight, variant of tashelhit, Middle Atlas Tamazight, Tamazight, Central Shilha and, rarely, Beraber or Braber; native name:  Tamazight) is a Berber language of the Afroasiatic language family spoken by 2.3 million in the Atlas Mountains of Central Morocco as well as by smaller emigrant communities in France and elsewhere.

Central Atlas Tamazight is one of the most-spoken Berber languages, along with Tachelhit, Kabyle, Riffian, Shawiya and Tuareg. In Morocco, it comes second as the most-spoken after Tachelhit. All five languages may be referred to as "Tamazight", but Central Atlas speakers are the only ones who use the term exclusively. As is typical of Afroasiatic languages, Tamazight has a series of "emphatic consonants" (realized as pharyngealized), uvulars, pharyngeals and lacks the phoneme /p/. Tamazight has a phonemic three-vowel system but also has numerous words without vowels.

Central Atlas Tamazight (unlike neighbouring Tashelhit) had no known significant writing tradition until the 20th century. It is now officially written in the Tifinagh script for instruction in Moroccan schools, while descriptive linguistic literature commonly uses the Latin alphabet, and the Arabic alphabet has also been used.

The standard word order is verb–subject–object but sometimes subject–verb–object. Words inflect for gender, number and state, using prefixes, suffixes and circumfixes. Verbs are heavily inflected, being marked for tense, aspect, mode, voice, person of the subject and polarity, sometimes undergoing ablaut. Pervasive borrowing from Arabic extends to all major word classes, including verbs; borrowed verbs, however, are conjugated according to native patterns, including ablaut.

Classification 
Central Atlas Tamazight is one of the four most-spoken Berber languages, in addition to Kabyle, Tachelhit, and Riffian, and it comes second as the most-spoken Berber language after Tachelhit in Morocco. Differentiating these dialects is complicated by the fact that speakers of other languages may also refer to their language as 'Tamazight'. The differences between all three groups are largely phonological and lexical, rather than syntactic. Tamazight itself has a relatively large degree of internal diversity, including whether spirantization occurs.

Central Atlas Tamazight speakers refer to themselves as Amazigh (pl. Imazighen), an endonymic ethnonym whose etymology is uncertain, but may translate as "free people". The term Tamazight, the feminine form of Amazigh, refers to the language. Both words are also used self-referentially by other Berber groups to replace local terms such as Ašəlḥi or Arifi, although Central Atlas Tamazight speakers use them regularly and exclusively.

In older studies, Central Atlas Tamazight is sometimes referred to as "Braber" / "Beraber", a dialectical Arabic term, or its Tamazight equivalent "Taberbrit". This is related to the Standard Arabic and English term "Berber", used to refer to all Berber dialects/languages, though eschewed by many Berbers because its etymology is pejorative.

Tamazight belongs to the Berber branch of the Afroasiatic language family; Afroasiatic subsumes a number of languages in North Africa and Southwest Asia including the Semitic languages, the Egyptian language, and the Chadic and Cushitic languages. Along with most other Berber languages, Tamazight has retained a number of widespread Afroasiatic features, including a two-gender system, verb–subject–object (VSO) typology, emphatic consonants (realized in Tamazight as pharyngealized), a templatic morphology, and a causative morpheme /s/ (the latter also found in other macrofamilies, such as the Niger–Congo languages.) Within Berber, Central Atlas Tamazight belongs, along with neighbouring Tashelhiyt, to the Atlas branch of the Northern Berber subgroup.

Tamazight is in the middle of a dialect continuum between Riff to its north-east and Shilha to its south-west. The basic lexicon of Tamazight differs markedly from Shilha, and its verbal system is more similar to Riff or Kabyle. Moreover, Tamazight has a greater amount of internal diversity than Shilha.

Tamazight's dialects are divided into three distinct subgroups and geographic regions: those spoken in the Middle Atlas mountains; those spoken in the High Atlas mountains; and those spoken in Jbel Saghro and its foothills. Southern dialects (e.g. Ayt Atta) may also be differentiated syntactically: while other dialects predicate with the auxiliary /d/ (e.g. /d argaz/ "it's a man"), Southern dialects use the typically (High Atlas, Souss-Basin rural country, Jbel Atlas Saghro) auxiliary verb /g/ (e.g. /iga argaz/ "it's a man"). The differences between each of the three groups are primarily phonological.

Groups speaking Tamazight include: Ait Ayache, Ait Morghi, Ait Alaham, Ait Youb, Marmoucha, Ait Youssi, Beni Mguild, Zayane, Zemmour, Ait Rbaa, Ait Seri, Guerouane, Ait Segougou, Ait Yafelman, Ait Sikhmane, Ayt Ndhir (Beni Mtir).

There is some ambiguity as to the eastern boundary of Central Atlas Tamazight. The dialect of the Ait Seghrouchen and Ait Ouarain tribes are commonly classed as Central Atlas Tamazight, and Ait Seghrouchen is reported to be mutually intelligible with the neighbouring Tamazight dialect of Ait Ayache. Genetically, however, they belong to the Zenati subgroup of Northern Berber, rather than to the Atlas subgroup to which the rest of Central Atlas Tamazight belongs, and are therefore excluded by some sources from Central Atlas Tamazight. The Ethnologue lists another group of Zenati dialects, South Oran Berber (ksours sud-oranais), as a dialect of Central Atlas Tamazight, but these are even less similar, and are treated by Berber specialists as a separate dialect group.

History 

The Berbers have lived in North Africa between western Egypt and the Atlantic Ocean since before recorded history began in the region about 33 centuries ago. By the 5th century BC, the city of Carthage, founded by Phoenicians, had extended its hegemony across much of North Africa; in the wake of the Punic Wars, Rome replaced it as regional hegemon.

Arabs conquered the area of modern-day Morocco and Algeria around the 7th century, prompting waves of Arab migration and Berber adoption of Islam. Particularly following the arrival of the Banu Hilal in modern-day Tunisia in the 11th century, more and more of North Africa became Arabic-speaking over the centuries. However, along with other high mountainous regions of North Africa, the Middle Atlas continued to speak Berber.

Between the 12th and 15th centuries, the Central Atlas, along with the rest of Morocco, successively fell within the domain of the Berber Almoravid, Almohad, and Marinid dynasties. Since the 17th century the region has acknowledged the rule of the Alaouite Dynasty, the current Moroccan royal family. However, effective control of the region was limited; until the 20th century much of the Central Atlas was in a condition of siba, recognising the spiritual legitimacy of royal authority but rejecting its political claims. The expansion of the Ait Atta starting from the 16th century brought Tamazight back into the already Arabised Tafilalt region and put other regional tribes on the defensive, leading to the formation of the Ait Yafelman alliance.

The 1912 Treaty of Fez made most of Morocco a French-Spanish protectorate (under French and Spanish military occupation), leaving the Alaouite monarchy but establishing a French military presence in the Atlas region and installing a French commissioner-general. However, the Berber tribes of the Middle Atlas, as in other areas, put up stiff military resistance to French rule, lasting until 1933 in the case of the Ait Atta.

After Morocco's independence in 1956, a strong emphasis was laid on the country's Arab identity, and a national Arabic language educational system was instituted, in which Berber languages, including Middle Atlas Tamazight, had no place. However, in 1994 the government responded to Berber demands for recognition by decreeing that Berber should be taught and establishing television broadcasts in three Berber languages, including Central Atlas Tamazight. For the promotion of Tamazight and other Berber languages and cultures, the government created the Royal Institute of Amazigh Culture (IRCAM) in 2001.

Geographic distribution 

Central Atlas Tamazight is among the four most-spoken Berber languages (the other three being Kabyle, Shilha, and Riff), and rivals Shilha as the most-spoken Berber language in Morocco. Central Atlas Tamazight is mostly spoken in the entire Middle Atlas and its outcroppings, reaching east to Taza and west to the region near Rabat. It is also spoken in the central and eastern High Atlas mountains in Morocco. It is thus spoken across areas with widely varying ecological conditions — from the mountainous and forested regions of the Middle Atlas mountains to the oases of the northwestern Sahara (Tafilalt). Berber in Morocco is spread into three areas: Riff in the north, Central Atlas in the center, and Shilha in the south/southwest. Central Atlas is not mutually intelligible with the Riff language but is with the Shilha dialect; Shilha- and Riff-speakers also cannot understand each other, That said, the Riffian language is of course related to both Shilha and Atlas Tamazight, and even though Riffian and the other two are not mutually intelligible, they share a high degree of the same vocabulary and grammar.

Figures for the number of speakers of Berber languages are generally a matter of estimates rather than linguistic censuses. At least a third of Moroccans seem to speak Berber languages,. Tamazight is estimated to be spoken by about 40~49% of Morocco's Berber-speakers, while Shilha commands 32~40% and Riff 20~25%.

Status 

Tamazight, along with other Berber languages of Morocco, has a low sociolinguistic status, used mainly in the home, and rarely in official or formal contexts. Media broadcasts and music are available in it, and there is a policy of teaching it in schools, although it is not always applied.

Of the Central Atlas Tamazight speakers, 40–45% are monolingual, while the others use Arabic as a second language. Monolingual speakers consist mostly of older generations and children. Women are more likely to be monolingual than men, since they typically stay in the village while the men go to work in the cities. Since Tamazight is the language of the home, girls grow up speaking Berber languages and pass them on to their children — this gender stratification helps to preserve the language. Bilingual Berber speakers have learned Moroccan Arabic via schooling, migration, media, or through the government. Most rural Berber children are monolingual. They struggle to succeed in schools where the teachers do not speak Berber, and require them to learn both Arabic and French.

Rural Morocco, including the Central Atlas area, suffers from poverty. Tamazight along with its relative Shilha are undergoing "contraction" as rural families, motivated by economic necessity, move to cities and stop speaking Tamazight, leading many intellectuals to fear Berber language shift or regression. However, Tamazight speakers are reported to immigrate less than many other Berber groups. Moreover, Tamazight has a large enough body of native speakers not to be considered under risk of endangerment, although Tamazight speakers reportedly have a lower birth rate than the country of Morocco as a whole.

Official status 

As of the Moroccan constitutional referendum, 2011, the Berber languages are official in Morocco alongside Arabic. In 1994, King Hassan II declared that a national Berber dialect would acquire a formal status; television broadcasts are summarized in Tamazight, as well as Shilha and Rif, three times a day; and educational materials for schools are being developed. On October 17, 2001 King Mohammed VI sealed the decree (Dahir 1–01–299) creating and organizing the Royal Institute of Amazigh Culture (IRCAM). IRCAM's board is composed of Amazigh experts, artists, and activists, all of whom are appointed by the king. The institute, located in Rabat, has played an important role in the establishment of the Tifinagh script in Morocco. There are multiple political parties and cultural associations in Morocco that advocate for the advancement of Berber, calling for it to be recognized as an official language, used more extensively in the mass media, and taught more in schools.

A legal issue affecting Tamazight speakers is restrictions on naming - Moroccan law stipulates that first names must have a "Moroccan character", and uncommon names, including some Berber ones used in the Central Atlas, are often rejected by the civil registry.

Orthography 

Until the 20th century Tamazight, like many other Berber languages but in contrast with neighbouring Tashelhiyt, was basically unwritten (although sporadic cases, using Arabic script, are attested.) It was preserved through oral use in rural areas, isolated from urban hubs. Scholars from the Middle Atlas, as elsewhere in North Africa, usually wrote in the more prestigious Arabic language, rather than their vernacular.

At present three writing systems exist for Berber languages, including Tamazight: Neo-Tifinagh, the Latin alphabet and the Arabic script. To some extent, the choice of writing system is a political one, with various subgroups expressing preference based on ideology and politics. The orthography used for government services including schooling is Neo-Tifinagh, rendered official by a Dahir of King Mohammed VI based on the recommendation of IRCAM. However, various Latin transcriptions have been used in a number of linguistic works describing Central Atlas Tamazight, notably the dictionary of Taïfi (1991).

Phonology

Consonants 
Central Atlas Tamazight has a contrastive set of "flat" consonants, manifested in two ways:

 For front segments,)
 For back segments,)

Note that pharyngealization may spread to a syllable or even a whole word. Historically Proto-Berber only had two pharyngealized phonemes, but modern Berber languages have borrowed others from Arabic and developed new ones through sound shifts.

All segments may be geminated except for the pharyngeals . In addition, in Arabic loans singleton non-spirantized  occur (though  and to an extent  often alternate with their spirantized versions in loans), giving this alternation marginal phonemic status.

Phonetic notes:
/k ɡ/ are fricatives [ ] in the Ayt Ayache dialect
/χʷ/ and /ʁʷ/ rare—native speakers can freely substitute 
Pharyngeal consonants mostly in Arabic loans
 is aspirated.

Vowels 

Tamazight has a typical phonemic three-vowel system:

These phonemes have numerous allophones, conditioned by the following environments:

(# denotes word boundary, C̊ denotes C[−flat − −], Ç denotes C[+flat], G denotes {Ç, })

Phonetic Schwa

There is a predictable non-phonemic vowel inserted into consonant clusters, realized as  before front consonants (e.g. ) and  before back consonants (e.g. . It is voiced before voiced consonants and voiceless before voiceless consonants, or alternatively it can be realized as a voiced or unvoiced consonant release. It also may be realized as the syllabicity of a nasal, lateral, or /r/.

The occurrence of schwa epenthesis is governed morphophonemically. These are some of the rules governing the occurrence of :

(# denotes word boundary, R denotes , H denotes , ℞ denotes R or H, and B denotes not R or H.)

Examples:
 >  ('you (fp) turned')
 >  ('she is present')
 >  ('to meet')

However note that word-initial initial  are realized as  before consonants.

Tamazight in fact has numerous words without phonemic vowels, and those consisting entirely of voiceless consonants will not phonetically contain voiced vowels.

French publications tended to include  in their transcriptions of Berber forms despite their predictability, perhaps due to the French vowel system. This can cause problems because alternations such as  'he slaughtered' –  'he did not slaughter' would then have to be morphologically conditioned.

Stress 

Word stress is non-contrastive and predictable — it falls on the last vowel in a word (including schwa).

Examples:
 >  ('to ask')
 >  ('he is present')
 >  ('to explain')
 >  ('you (fp) explained')

Grammar 

Central Atlas Tamazight grammar has many features typical of Afro-Asiatic languages, including extensive apophony in both the derivational and inflectional morphology, gender, possessive suffixes, VSO typology, the causative morpheme /s/, and use of the status constructus.

Morphology 

Tamazight nouns are inflected for gender, number, and state. Singular masculine nouns usually have the prefix /a-/, and singular feminines the circumfix . Plurals may either involve a regular change ("sound plurals"), internal vowel change ("broken plurals"), or a combination of the two. Masculine plurals usually take the prefix , feminines , and sound plurals also take the suffix  in masculine and } in feminine, although many other plural patterns are found too.

Examples:
  'big tent(s)' (m)
  'Berber(s)' (m)
  'sandal(s)' (m)
  'mule(s)' (m)
  'tent(s)' (f)
  'cow(s)' (f)
  'mat(s)' (f)
  'property(ies)' (f)

Nouns may be put into the construct state (contrasting with free state) to indicate possession, or when the subject of a verb follows the verb. This is also used for nouns following numerals and some prepositions, as well as the conjunction  ('and'). The construct state is formed as follows: in masculines, initial  becomes , initial  becomes , and initial  becomes . In feminines, initial  usually becomes , initial  usually becomes , and initial  remains unchanged.

Examples (in Ayt Ayache):
  ( ← ) 'head of the house'
  ( ← ) 'the horse of the bride'

Central Atlas Tamazight's personal pronouns distinguish three persons, and two genders. Pronouns appear in three forms: an independent form used in the subject position, a possessive suffix (and a derived independent possessive pronoun), and an object form affixed to the controlling verb.

Demonstrative pronouns distinguish between proximate and remote. When they occur independently, they inflect for number. They may also be suffixed to nouns, e.g. /tabardaja/ 'this pack-saddle'.

Central Atlas Tamazight verbs are heavily inflected, being marked for tense, aspect, mode, voice, person, and polarity. Tamazight verbs have at their core a stem, modified by prefixes, suffixes, moveable affixes, circumfixes, and ablaut. The prefixes indicate voice, tense, aspect, and polarity, while the suffixes indicate mood (normal, horatory, or imperative). Subject markers are circumfixed to the verb, while object marking and satellite framing are accomplished via either prefixing or suffixing depending on environment Some verb forms are accompanied by ablaut, and sometimes metathesis.

Pronominal complement markers cliticize to the verb, with the indirect object preceding the direct object, e.g. /iznz-as-t/ "he sold it to him".

Attributive Adjectives after the noun they modify, and inflect for number and gender. Adjectives may also occur alone, in which case they become an NP. Practically all adjectives also have a verbal form used for predicative purposes, which behaves just like a normal verb.

 /argaz amʕdur/ 'the foolish man' (lit. 'man foolish')
 /tamtˤut tamʕdur/ 'the foolish woman' 
 /irgzen imʕdar/ 'the foolish men'
 /tajtʃin timʕdar/ 'the foolish women'
 /i-mmuʕdr urgaz/ 'the man is foolish' (lit. '3ps–foolish man')
 /argaz i-mmuʕdr-n/ 'the foolish man' [using a non-finite verb]

These may take pronominal suffixes. Some prepositions require the following noun to be in the construct state, while others do not.

Syntax 
Word order is usually VSO (with the subject in construct state) but sometimes is SVO (with the subject in free state), e.g. ( vs.  'the Berber went out'). Tamazight also exhibits pro-drop behavior.

Tamazight may use a null copula, but the word  'to be, to do' can function as a copula in Ayt Ayache, especially in structures preceded by /aj/ 'who, which, what'.

wh- questions are always clefts, and multiple wh-questions do not occur. Consequently, Tamazight's clefting, relativisation, and wh-interrogation contribute to anti-agreement effects, similar to Shilha, and causes deletion of the verbal person marker in certain situations.

Vocabulary 

As a result of relatively intense language contact, Central Atlas Tamazight has a large stratum of Arabic loans. Many borrowed words in Berber also have native synonyms, e.g. /lbab/ or /tiflut/ 'door', the latter used more in rural areas. The contact was unequal, as Moroccan Arabic has not borrowed as much from Berber languages, though Berber has contributed to Moroccan and Algerian Arabics' very reduced vowel systems.

Arabic loans span a wide range of lexical classes. Many nouns begin with /l-/, from the Arabic definite prefix, and some Arabic feminines may acquire the native Berber feminine ending /-t/, e.g. /lʕafit/ for /lʕafia/ 'fire'. Many Arabic loans have been integrated into the Tamazight verb lexicon. They adhere fully to inflectional patterns of native stems, and may even undergo ablaut. Even function words are borrowed, e.g. // or // 'that', // 'although', // 'just', etc.

The first few (1–3 in Ayt Ayache and Ayt Ndhir) cardinal numerals have native Berber and borrowed Arabic forms. All higher cardinals are borrowed from Arabic, consistent with the linguistic universals that the numbers 1–3 are much more likely to be retained, and that a borrowed number generally implies that numbers greater than it are also borrowed. The retention of one is also motivated by the fact that Berber languages near-universally use unity as a determiner.

Central Atlas Tamazight uses a bipartite negative construction (e.g. /uriffiɣ ʃa/ 'he did not go out') which apparently was modeled after proximate Arabic varieties, in a common development known as Jespersen's Cycle. It is present in multiple Berber varieties, and is argued to have originated in neighboring Arabic and been adopted by contact.

Examples

See also 
 Languages of Morocco
 Shilha language

Notes 
(from "[nb 1]")

References

Bibliography

External links 

  INALCO report on Central Atlas Tamazight: maps, extension, dialectology, name
 UCLA Archive for Tamazight
 Berber (Middle Atlas)
 Tamazight Dictionary (southern variety)

Berber languages
Berbers in Morocco
Languages of Morocco
Verb–subject–object languages